Aspitates is a genus of moths in the family Geometridae.

Selected species
 Aspitates aberrata (H. Edwards, 1884)
 Aspitates acuminaria (Eversmann, 1851)
 Aspitates albaria
 Aspitates collinaria (Holt-White, 1894)
 Aspitates conspersarius
 Aspitates forbesi
 Aspitates gilvaria – straw belle (Denis & Schiffermüller, 1775)
 Aspitates ochrearia – yellow belle
 Aspitates orciferaria
 Aspitates stschurowskyi (Erschoff, 1874)
 Aspitates taylorae (Butler, 1893)

References
 
Watson, L., and Dallwitz, M.J. 2003 onwards. British insects: the genera of Lepidoptera-Geometridae. Version: 29 December 2011 online Full description.

Aspitatini
Geometridae genera